The 2nd Houston Film Critics Society Awards were given out at a ceremony held at the Museum of Fine Arts, Houston on December 17, 2008.  The awards are presented annually by the Houston Film Critics Society based in Houston, Texas.

Winners and nominees
Winners are listed first and highlighted with boldface

References

External links
Houston Film Critics Society: Awards

2008
2008 film awards
2008 in Texas
Houston